The Upper Guadalupe River Authority or UGRA was created in 1939 by the Texas Legislature as a quasi-governmental entity to manage the Guadalupe River as a water resource in Kerr County, Texas.  The authority is chartered with the mandate "to control, develop, store, preserve and distribute" the water resources of the Upper Guadalupe River watershed.  The organization is managed by a nine-person Board of Directors appointed to five-year terms by the Governor of Texas.  The UGRA is a taxing authority, and derives a portion of its funding from property taxes levied against residents of Kerr County.  The authority operates a Regional Water Testing Laboratory and a county-wide flood alert system, but does not operate any dams.

See also 
 Guadalupe-Blanco River Authority
 List of Texas river authorities

References 

Government agencies established in 1939
River authorities of Texas
State agencies of Texas
Kerr County, Texas
1939 establishments in Texas